All India Students' Association (AISA) is a left wing student organisation in India. It describes itself as "the voice of the radical students' movement" and is affiliated to the Communist Party of India (Marxist–Leninist) Liberation. The association was previously affiliated to the IPF. The association was founded in Allahabad on 9 August 1990 with the merger of several left wing students organisations across India. AISA have organisational presence in the states and union territories of Delhi, Chandigarh, Uttarakhand, Uttar Pradesh, Assam, Uttarakhand, Bihar, Jharkhand, West Bengal, Tripura, etc. N. Sai Balaji is the National President of AISA and Sandeep Saurav is it's the National General Secretary.

Universities
The students association has presence in various major institutions of higher education in India; such as Patna University, University of Allahabad, Banaras Hindu University, Kumaun University, Jadavpur University, University of Delhi, University of Lucknow, Tata Institute of Social Sciences Jamia Millia Islamia and Jawaharlal Nehru University HNB Garhwal University  Ambedkar university Delhi among others. A unit of AISA also has consistently won Student union elections in Rikhnikhal Degree college, Pauri garhwal Uttarakhand since 2017.

AISA has consistently won in Jawaharlal Nehru University Students' Union elections since 2006. The victory of AISF in 2016  JNUSU elections were the time when AISA lost its president-ship.

Since 2013, AISA is one of the major left force in Delhi University Students Union elections.

Notable alumni 
 Chandrashekhar Prasad
 Sandeep Saurav

Controversies 
In 2016, Anmol Ratan, a senior AISA leader was accused of rape. He was expelled from the students organisation following the accusation. He subsequently surrendered and was arrested by Delhi Police.

See also 
 Revolutionary Youth Association
 All India Students Federation
 Students' Federation of India

References

External links

DU Times

1990 establishments in India
Communist Party of India (Marxist–Leninist) Liberation
Student organizations established in 1990
Student wings of communist parties of India